Sylvester Stallone is an American actor, screenwriter, and film director who has appeared in multiple film roles. Throughout his career, Stallone has been nominated for various awards, including Academy Awards, British Academy Film Awards, Golden Raspberry Awards, and People's Choice Awards.

Major associations

Academy Awards

BAFTA Awards

Golden Globe Awards

Popular Awards

Critics' Choice Movie Awards

People's Choice Awards

Other awards and nominations

Austin Film Critics Association

Boston Society of Film Critics

Chicago Film Critics Association Awards

César Award

David di Donatello Awards

Golden Apple Award

Golden Camera

Golden Raspberry Awards

Hasty Pudding Theatricals

Hollywood Film Festival

Hollywood Walk of Fame

Houston Film Critics Society

Jupiter Awards

Online Film Critics Society

Palm Springs International Film Festival

National Board of Review

National Film & TV Awards

Saturn Award / Academy of Science Fiction, Fantasy & Horror Films

ShoWest Convention

Stockholm International Film Festival

Taurus World Stunt Awards

Venice Film Festival

Video Dealers Software Association

Writers Guild of America Awards

Zurich Film Festival

References

External links

Awards
Lists of awards received by American actor